Chroberz  is a village in Poland with 964 inhabitants (2005). It is situated in Świętokrzyskie Voivodeship, Pińczów County, Gmina Złota. In the years of 1975–1998 Chroberz administratively belonged to Kielce Voivodeship.

Etymology
The name Chroberz originates from Old Polish word "chrobry" which meant brave. According to the tradition, it refers to Bolesław Chrobry who built a castle and founded a parish in Chroberz.

History
According to the chronicle of Marcin Kromer, in 1019 or 1020 Bolesław Chrobry, while returning from Kiev Expedition (1018), established a settlement in Chroberz. The first mention about town appears in an 1153 document Codex diplomaticus Poloniae, in which today's Chroberz is referred to as Chrober.

In the 13th century Chroberz seems to have been a place of some significance in the Kraków district. Two monarchs from Kraków – Leszek I the White and Bolesław V the Chaste stayed in Chroberz for some time during their reigns.

Notes

References

External links

 Official local website

Villages in Pińczów County
Kielce Governorate
Kielce Voivodeship (1919–1939)